Não é Azul, Mas é Mar (in English "It's not blue, but it's [the] sea") is an album by musician, singer, and composer Djavan released in 1987 by Sony Records. Recorded in Los Angeles, California, and produced by Ronnie Foster, it was sold in Brazil, the United States, Japan, and some European countries. The major hits from the album are "Soweto", "Dou-não-Dou" (one of the major hits of the album selected to enter the soundtrack of Brazilian soap "Mandala" in 1987) and some other prominent among audiences and critics alike: "Florio", "Real", "Doidice", "Navio" e "Carnaval do Rio".

Tracks
Soweto (Djavan)
Bouquet (Djavan)
Me Leve (Djavan)
Dou-Não-Dou (Djavan)
Florir (Djavan)
Carnaval do Rio (Djavan)
Navio (Flávia Vírginia/Max Frederico/Djavan)
Maçã (Djavan)
Real (Tetsuo Sakurai/Djavan)
Doidice (Djavan)

References

1987 albums
Djavan albums